Notolychnus valdiviae, the topside lanternfish, is a species of lanternfish found in the oceans worldwide.  This species grows to a length of  TL.

References

 

Myctophidae
Taxa named by Alec Fraser-Brunner
Monotypic marine fish genera